The Yakima River is a tributary of the Columbia River in south central and eastern Washington state, named for the indigenous Yakama people. Lewis and Clark mention in their journals that the Chin-nâm pam (or the Lower Snake River Chamnapam Nation) called the river Tâpe têtt (also rendered Tapteete), possibly from the French tape-tête, meaning "head hit". It is the longest river entirely in Washington state.

Course 

About 9 million years ago, the Yakima River flowed south from near Vantage to the Tri-Cities, and then turned west straight for the ocean through Badger Canyon west of Kennewick. Badger Canyon was once a waterway of the Yakima River, this pre-existing channel led the Yakima River to make tribute to the Columbia River at the current location of the city of Kennewick. Beginning nearly 15,000 years ago the Columbia Plateau was transformed by the successive Missoula glacial outburst floods. Much of the flood water made way down the Columbia river Channel where a 'choke-point' known as Wallula Gap caused the restriction of flow. Floodwaters began ponding near the Tri-Cities resulting in the back-flooding of the Columbia's tributary valleys. Badger Canyon was an entry point for back-flooding of the Yakima Valley, successive floods left behind thick deposits of sediments in Badger Canyon and the Valley beyond. These flood deposits which were deposited in large quantities in short amounts of time changed the ground elevation within Badger Canyon causing the Yakima River to re-route north of Red Mountain and enter the Columbia River by present-day Richland.

During the last ice age, the Missoula Floods further altered the landscape of the area, opening up the Horn Rapids area to the Yakima River. The West Fork of Amon Creek now utilizes Badger Canyon.

The first western explorers to visit the river were Lewis and Clark on or about October 17, 1805. They stopped briefly at the confluence of the Yakima and the Columbia, although they did not proceed upriver. The river was then known to local Native Americans as "Tap Teel", although the area has been inhabited since prehistory.

Recreation 

The Yakima River is used for rafting, kayaking, and fishing, especially around the Ellensburg area and near the confluence with the Columbia River during the summer months.  The Yakima River is ranked between Class I and Class II rapids, depending on the circumstances and season. In the Tri-Cities, the delta where the Yakima meets the Columbia has several hiking trails.

The dry climate, with over 300 sunshine days a year, draws visitors from Seattle, about two hours' drive away.

Yakima Valley 

The Yakima River Basin consists of approximately  located in south central Washington State. It is bounded by the Cascade Mountains on the west, the Wenatchee Mountains on the north, Rattlesnake Mountain and the Rattlesnake Hills on the east, and the Horse Heaven Hills to the south. The basin encompasses areas designated by the Washington Department of Ecology as the Upper Yakima Water Resource Inventory Areas (WRIAs) 38 and 39 and the Lower Yakima WRIA 37. The dividing line between these northern and southern sections is the confluence of the Naches and Yakima Rivers.

The Yakima River provides irrigation for the dry but fertile land in the valley, and irrigated agriculture is the economic base. Agricultural land totals , including irrigated pastures, orchards, grapes, hops, and field crops. A significant portion of Washington apples and cherries are grown in the valley, as well as most (75%) of the United States's hops. Since the late 20th century, the wine industry has grown rapidly in the area. It is the location of the Yakima Valley AVA, a designated American Viticultural Area.

Major landowners in the valley include federal and state agencies and the Yakama Indian Nation. The United States Forest Service manages , and the Yakama Nation owns  within the basin.

Major population centers include the city of Yakima and the Tri-Cities area. Population growth for the 1990s was projected at 7.9% in Kittitas County, 19.7% in Yakima County, and 22.7% in Benton County. While much of the growth in Benton and Yakima counties has been in and around the incorporated areas, most of the growth in Kittitas County has been in unincorporated areas.

In addition to irrigated agriculture, the major economic driving forces include timber harvest and processing, cattle, and outdoor recreation. With the significant reduction in timber harvesting on federal lands and the implementation of the Northwest Forest Plan to protect the endangered northern spotted owl, the timber economy has been greatly eroded in recent years. The proximity to high population areas of the Puget Sound has caused a rapid increase in the demand for outdoor recreational experiences in the basin.

River modifications
The Yakima River and its tributaries have been heavily altered for the purpose of irrigated agriculture. There are numerous dams and irrigation canals. Irrigation runoff is in places returned to the river through canal drains. The irrigation system in the Yakima's watershed causes periods of both severe river dewatering and elevated flows, relative to the historic streamflow regime. As a result, discharge statistics for the Yakima River are heavily affected by the irrigation system. The USGS operates four streamflow gauges on the Yakima River. The highest average discharge recorded, is more than halfway up the river at Union Gap. The two downriver gauges show average flows of a reduced amount.

See also
List of rivers of Washington
List of tributaries of the Columbia River

References

 
Rivers of Washington (state)
Washington (state) wine
Yakima, Washington
Tributaries of the Columbia River
Rivers of Yakima County, Washington
Rivers of Kittitas County, Washington
Rivers of Benton County, Washington
Valleys of Washington (state)